Earl Simmons (December 18, 1970 – April 9, 2021), known professionally as DMX, was an American rapper and actor. He began rapping in the early 1990s and released his debut album It's Dark and Hell Is Hot in 1998, to both critical acclaim and commercial success, selling 251,000 copies within its first week of release. DMX released his best-selling album, ... And Then There Was X, in 1999, which included the hit single "Party Up (Up in Here)". His 2003 singles "Where the Hood At?" and "X Gon' Give It to Ya" were also commercially successful. He was the first artist to debut an album at No.1 five times in a row on the Billboard 200 charts. Considered to be one of the best rappers of his generation, DMX sold over 74 million records overall worldwide.

DMX was featured in films such as Belly, Romeo Must Die, Exit Wounds, Cradle 2 the Grave, and Last Hour. In 2006, he starred in the reality television series DMX: Soul of a Man, which was primarily aired on the BET cable television network. In 2003, he published a book of his memoirs entitled E.A.R.L.: The Autobiography of DMX.

DMX died on April 9, 2021, following a cocaine-induced heart attack.

Early life
Earl Simmons was born on December 18, 1970, with various accounts giving his birthplace as either Baltimore, Maryland or Mount Vernon, New York. He was the son of 19-year-old Arnett Simmons and 18-year-old Joe Barker. Earl was Simmons' second child; she had given birth to a daughter, Bonita, two years prior, and later gave birth to one daughter, Shayla, and two stillborn sons. His father, Barker, was an artist who painted watercolor paintings of street scenes to sell at local fairs. Barker moved to Philadelphia and was largely absent from his life.

As a child, Simmons suffered greatly from bronchial asthma, being taken to the emergency room almost nightly due to him waking up unable to breathe. He was raised as a Jehovah's Witness but became disillusioned with the faith after an incident where he was hit by a drunk driver while crossing the street. A month later, an insurance representative went to his house to try and reach an agreement to prevent his family from suing. Simmons claims he was told that his family could have been awarded a settlement of $10,000 and possibly even more for the injuries he sustained but that his mother rejected the settlement as she claimed that Jehovah's Witnesses are taught to be self-sufficient although the group's official doctrine at the time did not prohibit suing or receiving settlements.

Simmons went through a disjointed childhood that included being beaten by his mother and her various boyfriends so badly that he lost teeth and sustained numerous bruises and cuts on his face. Due to poverty, he slept on the floor with roaches and mice crawling over him in the night. When Simmons was five years old, his family settled into the School Street Projects in
Yonkers, New York. When he was six years old, his mother knocked out two of his teeth with a broom after he erased something in her notebook. At school, he threw chairs at teachers and stabbed another child in the face with a pencil. When he was seven, an aunt got him drunk on vodka. The same year, he was jailed for stealing cakes from a market. One summer, his mother locked him in his bedroom, allowing him to only exit for trips to the bathroom. At the end of the fifth grade, at age 10, Simmons was expelled from school and sent to the Julia Dyckman Andrus Children's Home for 18 months. In what he described as a defining moment of betrayal, his mother tricked him by telling him they were just visiting the home, then she enrolled him there. A few months later, he was arrested for arson in an attempt to burn the school down. He nearly killed his co-conspirator.

When he was 14, Simmons began living on the streets of Yonkers to escape his mother's abuse, sleeping in Salvation Army clothing bins and befriending stray dogs.

Shortly after he began doing this, his mother once again sent him to a group home. During his stay, Simmons bonded with other students from New York over their shared love of hip hop music. After performing for his friends, they encouraged Simmons to continue writing music at the behest of his teacher. When he returned home, Simmons met Ready Ron, a local rapper, who was impressed with Simmons' beatboxing skills and asked him to become his partner. Simmons chose the name "DMX", which came from an instrument he had used at the boys' home, the Oberheim DMX drum machine. It later was also interpreted as "Dark Man X".

As a freshman at Yonkers Middle High School, DMX was the second-fastest on the track-and-field varsity team. However, he had bad grades and a sparse attendance record. He turned to robbery as a way to get out of poverty: his first was a purse snatch theft in Yonkers that netted him $1,000, which he used to buy a leather dog collar and dog harness for his dog, and a pair of Timberland boots for himself. By the end of the year, he attended school just to rob people and was robbing three people per day. He then turned to carjacking.

Musical career

1985–1996: Career beginnings
DMX got his start in the music industry at age 14, in 1985, when he beatboxed for Ready Ron. After serving time in prison for stealing a dog, he began writing his own lyrics and performing at the local recreation center for younger children. In 1988, while in prison for carjacking, he began dedicating almost all of his free time to writing lyrics and also meeting and rapping with K-Solo. When he was released that summer, he began producing and selling his own mixtapes where he rapped over instrumentals from other songs and sold them on street corners, which helped him build a local fan base all over New York. DMX made an appearance on The Stretch Armstrong and Bobbito Show in 1991 with Percee P, where they both freestyled. DMX would later that year release a demo tape that featured "Spellbound" along with "Critical Condition", "Three Little Pigs", "The Original Author of Spellbound" and "Unstoppable Force". It featured a style similar to Big Daddy Kane and Rakim, unlike his later material.  In 1991, The Source magazine praised DMX in its Unsigned Hype column that highlighted unsigned hip-hop artists. The same year, Columbia Records signed DMX to its subsidiary label Ruffhouse Records, which released his debut single "Born Loser". He released his second single, "Make a Move" in 1994. He made a guest appearance alongside Jay-Z, Ja Rule, and Mic Geronimo on the classic underground track "Time to Build" on Mic Geronimo's debut album in 1995.

1996–2000: Signing with Def Jam and commercial success
DMX recorded tracks from September 1996 to January 1998 for his debut album. During this time, his guest appearances on Mase's singles "24 Hrs. to Live" and "Take What's Yours", The LOX's single "Money, Power & Respect", and LL Cool J's single "4, 3, 2, 1" created a strong buzz for the then-unsigned rapper. In February 1998, he released his debut major-label single "Get at Me Dog" on Def Jam Recordings. The single received an RIAA certification of gold. His first major-label album It's Dark and Hell Is Hot, which included the single "Ruff Ryders' Anthem", was then released in May 1998. The album debuted at number one on the Billboard 200 chart in the U.S. and sold over five million copies. In December 1998, he released his album Flesh of My Flesh, Blood of My Blood. It debuted at number one on the Billboard 200 and went multi-platinum. He released his third and best-selling album ... And Then There Was X, on December 21, 1999. It was his third album to debut at number one on the Billboard 200. Its most popular single, "Party Up (Up in Here)", became his first Top Ten hit on the R&B charts, and was nominated for a Grammy Award for Best Rap Solo Performance at the 2001 Grammy Awards. The album was certified six-times Platinum, and was nominated for Best Rap Album at the 2001 Grammy Awards. In 2000, DMX also made a cameo appearance in the Sum 41 music video for "Makes No Difference".

2001–2004: Return to music
After improving his legal situation, DMX returned to the studio to complete his fourth album, The Great Depression. Within its release on October 23, 2001, it was his fourth album to debut at number one on the Billboard 200, featuring the singles "Who We Be", "We Right Here", and "Shorty Was The Bomb". Despite the album's triple Platinum certification, its commercial and critical success was lower than his previous album. His fifth album, Grand Champ, released in September 2003, once again debuted at number one on the Billboard 200 and included the singles "Where the Hood At?" and "Get It on the Floor". After its release, he informed the public that he planned to retire and that Grand Champ was his final album.

2005–2011: Year of the Dog...Again and The Definition of X

DMX signed to Columbia Records in January 2006. He recorded his next album, Year of the Dog... Again, while switching record labels, which caused numerous delays. It was released on August 1, 2006, and missed the number one Billboard spot by only a few hundred copies. He released two more singles, "Lord Give Me a Sign" and "We in Here". On June 12, 2008, Def Jam Recordings released a compilation of his greatest hits The Definition of X: The Pick of the Litter. In 2011, Def Jam released another compilation album, The Best of DMX, which features hit singles including "Where the Hood At?" and "X Gon' Give It to Ya". In 2009, DMX claimed he would pursue preaching in Jersey City, New Jersey as well as continue to produce music. He completed a Gospel music album prior to his incarceration. According to MTV, he had semi-retired to study the Bible in an effort to give messages behind the pulpit.

2011–2013: Undisputed
On October 11, 2011, DMX performed at the 2011 BET Hip Hop Awards. He stated that he has been working "nonstop, every day" on his seventh album, which was titled Undisputed. A video for a new track entitled "Last Hope" was released via the Internet on September 24, 2011, and was later included on The Weigh In EP released digitally on May 5, 2012. In late February 2012, Seven Arts Pictures acquired the catalog of DMX's music and signed DMX to a two-album deal. During a performance at New York's Santos Party House on December 25, 2011, DMX stated that the new album would be titled Undisputed and would be released on March 26, 2012. After numerous delays, the album was eventually released on September 11, 2012, and featured production from Swizz Beatz and J.R. Rotem with a guest appearance by MGK.

2013–2021: Def Jam reunion and Exodus
In 2013, DMX announced he had begun working on his eighth studio album. He collaborated with producers Swizz Beatz and Dame Grease. In December, after regaining his passport, he embarked on a world tour with performances in Bulgaria and Kosovo. On January 7, 2015, Seven Arts Music announced that DMX would be releasing Redemption of the Beast the following week; however, close personal friend and recurring collaborator producer/rapper/entrepreneur Swizz Beatz and DMX's management confirmed that this was false. On January 13, 2015, Seven Arts Music released Redemption of the Beast, without acquiring a legal artist contract. On January 15, 2015, it was announced by DMX's brother/manager Montana that DMX was no longer signed to Seven Arts Music and that they would be taking legal action against Seven Arts Music for the unauthorized release of Redemption of the Beast.

Long-time collaborator Swizz Beatz stated that two of the collaborators on the album would be Kanye West and Dr. Dre. His 2003 song "X Gon' Give It to Ya" was featured in the 2016 film Deadpool and in its trailers. On June 28, 2016, DMX released a new song titled "Blood Red" and produced by Divine Bars. On January 11, 2017, DMX released a new song produced by Swizz Beats titled "Bain Iz Back". On September 20, 2019, DMX signed a new record deal with Def Jam Recordings, reuniting with the label for the first time since his 2003 album Grand Champ.

DMX's eighth and first posthumous studio album Exodus was released through Def Jam on May 28, 2021.

Personal life

Religion
DMX was a born-again Christian, and stated that he read the Bible every day. While in jail, DMX stated that he had a purpose for being there:  DMX was a transitional deacon and aspired to become ordained as a pastor, stating that he received this call in 2009. In 2016, he gave a sermon at a church in Phoenix, Arizona.

Relationships and children
DMX was the father of 17 children from 11 different women. He married his childhood friend Tashera Simmons in 1999 and they were married for 11 years. They had four children together: Xavier (born 1992), Tacoma (born 1999), Sean (born 2002), and Praise Mary Ella (born 2005). In July 2010, after his first of three incarcerations that year, Tashera announced their separation. They remained friends, although in 2016, Tashera accused DMX of missing his $10,000/month child support payment.

DMX had extramarital affairs during his marriage to Tashera, some of which produced children. He had a daughter, Sasha (born 2002), with Patricia Trejo. In 2012, Trejo sued DMX for $1 million in unpaid child support. The case was settled in 2013. DMX and Monique Wayne, a Maryland resident, fought over her claim that he was the father of her son born in 2004. She sued him for defamation and for child support. After genetic testing proved that DMX was the father, in January 2008, DMX was ordered to pay Wayne $1.5 million, but a judge vacated the judgment in May 2008. DMX also fathered a child in 2008 and fathered two daughters with Yadira Borrego. His fifteenth child was born to his fiancée Desiree Lindstrom on August 16, 2016. On December 5, 2019, DMX's sixteenth and seventeenth children, twin boys, were born to Pebbles Junell.

DMX did not have a will. As a result, legal battles ensued in probate courts following his death.

Finances and bankruptcies
DMX earned $2.3 million from his songs between 2010 and 2015.

He also filed for bankruptcy three times. His first filing was on July 30, 2013, citing his child support obligations as his priority claim. The filing was challenged by the United States Trustee Program and was dismissed by the U.S. Bankruptcy Court in Manhattan on November 11, 2013.

Feud with Ja Rule
During the 1990s, DMX formed a close bond with fellow up-and-coming rappers Jay-Z and Ja Rule. The three collaborated many times and formed a group known as Murder Inc. The group was short-lived due to internal issues between DMX and Jay-Z. After the breakup of Murder Inc., DMX disparaged Ja Rule in interviews, accusing him of being a copycat, drawing comparisons between himself and what he saw as Ja stealing his signature "gruff" style of delivery.

DMX released the diss track "They Want War" on a 2002 DJ Kay Slay mixtape; Ja Rule never directly responded. DMX also released the single "Go to Sleep" with Eminem and Obie Trice as part of the Cradle 2 the Grave soundtrack with numerous lines directed to Ja Rule. However, as time passed and the feud faded into obscurity, DMX said that he wanted to officially bring it to an end when he was released from prison in 2005: "Gotti came to me in jail and said I want to make peace with you and him. I was like, 'Alright Gotti, let's do it." Despite this, DMX and Ja Rule did not officially end their feud until 2009, at VH1's Hip Hop Honors.

Feud with Jay-Z
When DMX partnered with Jay-Z and Ja Rule in Murder Inc., there was a feud between the two, which also contributed to the failure of the group and working together. According to reports, the feud started in the early 1990s after a rap battle between the two, which led to DMX's disdain for Jay-Z. Prior to DMX's death, the feud, although it fizzled out over the years, continued on when DMX said in an Instagram video that he wanted to rap battle Jay-Z on Verzuz.

Legal issues

DMX was in jail 30 times for various offenses, including robbery, assault, carjacking, animal cruelty, reckless driving, driving under the influence, unlicensed driving, drug possession, probation violation, failure to pay child support, pretending to be a federal agent, and tax evasion.

1986–1988 
DMX was first sent to prison in 1986 after stealing a dog from a junkyard. He was sentenced to two years in the juvenile unit of Woodfield Prison in Valhalla, New York. However, just weeks after starting his sentence, he and his cellmate successfully escaped the prison and DMX returned home until his mother forced him to turn himself in and finish his sentence, which he did at the McCormick Juvenile Detention Centre in Brooktondale, New York. Simmons was sent to prison again in 1988 for carjacking, and was later moved to a higher security prison after attempting to extort a fellow inmate for drugs. He was released in the summer of 1988.

1998–1999 
 When officers of the Fort Lee Police Department executed a search of his home in 1999, DMX promptly surrendered himself on weapons possession charges.
 DMX faced a 1999 animal cruelty charge in Teaneck, New Jersey after a dozen pit bulls were found at his home there; the charge was dismissed after the performer agreed to accept responsibility and record public service announcements for an animal rights group.

2000–2005 Metro NY 
 In 2000, DMX served a 15-day jail sentence for possession of marijuana.
 DMX served another jail sentence in 2001 for driving without a license and possession of marijuana. His appeal to reduce the sentence was denied; rather, he was charged with assault for throwing objects at prison guards.
 In January 2002, DMX pleaded guilty in New Jersey to 13 counts of animal cruelty, two counts of maintaining a nuisance, and one count each of disorderly conduct and possession of drug paraphernalia. He eventually plea-bargained down to fines, probation, and community service and starred in public service announcements against the dangers of guns and animal abuse.
 In June 2004, DMX was arrested at the John F. Kennedy International Airport, on charges of cocaine possession, criminal impersonation, criminal possession of a weapon, criminal mischief, menacing, and driving under the influence of drugs or alcohol, while claiming to be a federal agent and attempting to carjack a vehicle. He was given a conditional discharge on December 8, 2004, but pleaded guilty on October 25, 2005, to violating parole.
 On November 18, 2005, DMX was sentenced to 70 days in jail at Riker's Island for violating parole; the lateness charge added a 10-day extension to the original 60-day sentence. DMX was released early (for "good behavior") on December 30, 2005.

2007 
 In 2007, DMX's home was raided on reports of animal cruelty.

2008–2011 Arizona and California 
 On May 9, 2008, DMX was arrested on drug and animal cruelty charges after attempting to barricade himself inside his home in Cave Creek, Arizona.
 DMX pleaded guilty to charges of drug possession, theft, and animal cruelty stemming from an August 2007 drug raid as well as the May 2008 arrest, at a hearing on December 30, 2008; he was sentenced to 90 days in jail on January 31, 2009.
 On May 22, 2009, DMX entered a plea agreement/change of plea and pleaded guilty to attempted aggravated assault in jail.
 After serving four out of six months for violating drug probation, DMX was released from jail on July 6, 2010. That day, a television pilot was filmed to portray his road to recovery; however, DMX was arrested three weeks later and the pilot did not evolve into a series.
 On July 27, 2010, DMX turned himself in to Los Angeles Metropolitan Court for a reckless driving charge he received in 2002. He was sentenced to serve ninety days in jail.
 On November 19, 2010, DMX was arrested in Maricopa County, Arizona on charges of violating probation for a February 24, 2009 aggravated assault on an officer while he was incarcerated. On December 20, 2010, DMX was moved to the Mental Health Unit of the Arizona Alhambra State Prison, and released on July 18, 2011.
While DMX admitted to speeding, he claimed he was driving .

2013 South Carolina 
 On February 13, 2013, DMX was arrested in Spartanburg, South Carolina for driving without a driver's license.
 On July 26, 2013, DMX was arrested again in Greenville County, South Carolina and charged with driving under the influence of alcohol as well as driving without a license.
 On August 20, 2013, DMX was arrested again in Greer, South Carolina during a traffic stop after a car he was a passenger in made an improper u-turn. He was arrested due to an outstanding warrant for driving under suspension. Four packages of marijuana were also found in the vehicle, and he along with the driver were cited for them.
 On November 4, 2013, DMX was again arrested by the Greenville-Spartanburg International Airport police near Greer, South Carolina after police, who were familiar with his prior arrests, noticed DMX behind the wheel of a vehicle at the terminal. DMX was booked on charges of driving with a suspended license, having an uninsured vehicle, and driving an unlicensed vehicle. He was subsequently released after spending three hours in jail.

2015 New York 
 On April 5, 2015, a man charged DMX of robbing him.
 On June 26, 2015, DMX was arrested in New York, charged with robbery in Newark, New Jersey and failure to pay child support.
 On July 14, 2015, DMX was sentenced to six months in jail for failure to pay $400,000 in child support.
 On December 14, 2015, an arrest warrant was issued for DMX after he missed a court hearing to address child support issues with his ex-wife Tashera Simmons and their four children.

2017–2019: Tax fraud conviction 
In July 2017, DMX was charged with 14 federal counts of tax fraud. Federal prosecutors charged him with failing to file income tax returns from 2010 to 2015 (a period when he earned at least $2.3 million). DMX pleaded guilty to a single count of tax fraud in November 2017. DMX was originally free pending sentencing but was remanded to jail in January 2018 after leaving a drug treatment program ordered by the court and relapsing with cocaine and oxycodone. In March 2018, Judge Jed S. Rakoff sentenced DMX to one year in prison followed by three years of supervised release. The court also ordered DMX to pay $2.29 million in restitution to the government. He was released from prison on January 25, 2019.

Health problems and death
Simmons said he became addicted to crack cocaine when he was 14 years old, after Ready Ron tricked him into smoking a marijuana cigarette laced with the drug. He also said that he had bipolar disorder.

Simmons entered drug rehabilitation several times including in 2002, 2017, and 2019, when he cancelled concerts.

On February 10, 2016, Simmons was found unresponsive in a parking lot at a Ramada Inn in Yonkers, New York. He was resuscitated by first responders and intravenously given Narcan, an opioid-reversal drug; he responded quickly to Narcan and became semi-conscious. Simmons was subsequently rushed to the hospital. A witness said he ingested some type of substance before collapsing, but police found no illegal substances on the property. Simmons stated that it was from an asthma attack.

On April 2, 2021, at approximately 11:00 pm, Simmons was rushed to White Plains Hospital, where he was reported to be in critical condition following a heart attack at his home possibly resulting from a drug overdose. The next day, his attorney Murray Richman confirmed Simmons was on life support. That same night, Simmons suffered cerebral hypoxia (oxygen deprivation to his brain) as paramedics attempted to resuscitate him for 30 minutes. Simmons' former manager, Nakia Walker, said he was in a "vegetative state" with "lung and brain failure and no current brain activity". His manager, Steve Rifkind, stated Simmons was comatose and that he was set to undergo tests to determine his brain's functionality and his family will "determine what's best from there".

On the morning of April 9, 2021, Simmons lost functionality in multiple essential organs, reportedly his liver, kidneys, and lungs, and was pronounced dead shortly after at age 50. It was revealed on July 8 by the Westchester County Medical Examiner's Office that Simmons' official cause of death was a cocaine-induced heart attack.

Legacy 

Various celebrities paid tribute through outlets like social media including former NFL player Torrey Smith, LeBron James, Shaquille O'Neal, Eminem, Gabrielle Union (who co-starred with DMX in the 2003 film Cradle 2 the Grave, along with Jet Li (who also paid tribute), Backstreet Boys member AJ McLean, Wyclef Jean, Swizz Beatz (who DMX collaborated with including on the hit single, "Ruff Ryders' Anthem"), Eve and Missy Elliott.

A "Celebration of Life" took place on April 24, 2021, led by Kanye West's Sunday Service Choir. They performed several songs in honor of DMX. The memorial took place at Barclays Center in Brooklyn with a limited capacity of 1,900. It was livestreamed on DMX's YouTube and Instagram accounts. On the way to Barclays, DMX's casket was carried by a black monster truck with "Long live DMX" painted on the side. A procession of hundreds of motorcyclists, in homage to the hip-hop collective Ruff Ryders, rode from DMX's birthplace of Yonkers, New York to Barclays Center. In between performances, people gave speeches including Eve, Nas, Swizz Beatz and Ruff Ryders founders Joaquin "Waah" Dean & Darin "Dee" Dean. Kanye West was also confirmed to be in attendance of the celebration, according to Variety.

DMX's funeral ("DMX's Homegoing Celebration") took place in Brooklyn at the Christian Cultural Center on April 25, 2021. It was livestreamed on the BET Network and its YouTube channel. It lasted around five hours to a limited capacity of 2,000 people. DMX's casket was in the color red and featured the word "FAITH" in large printing. It was featured in the front of the room. People who were in attendance included Nas, Lil Kim, Alicia Keys and Swizz Beatz as well as the pastor of the church, Reverend A.R. Bernard. Louis Farrakhan, a leader of the Nation of Islam, joined the service via Zoom. With the exception of Alicia Keys, Nas and Lil Kim, they all gave speeches. DMX's former wife, Tashera Simmons and Ruff Ryders founders Waah & Dee also gave a speech. There was some controversial testimonies like former Def Jam chief Lyor Cohen, when his video featured an overhead view of a beach and explained how Earl Simmons was a wonderful man while DMX was a gremlin. Additionally, Def Jam cofounder Russell Simmons compared his own issues with drug abuse to DMX via video. The homegoing ended with DMX's obituary read on stage and a virtual performance from Faith Evans.

At the funeral, New York City community leader and peacemaker Erica Ford presented DMX's family several citations and proclamations from the New York governor's and Senate's office, including a proclamation from the New York state Senate declaring December 18—DMX's birthday—"Earl 'DMX' Simmons Day." Additional citations came from Gov. Andrew Cuomo and Mayor Mike Spano of Yonkers (the hometown of DMX). Cuomo had the flag flying over the state capitol on the day of DMX's death presented to his family.

Impact 
DMX had a significant impact on hip hop music and is considered a legend in the genre. He "defined 2000s rap" and was "among the most prolific rappers of his era". He broke and set numerous records. His early work was vastly different from most mainstream hip hop music at the time; while Puff Daddy and other artists of the Bad Boy Records label were at the height of popularity, characterized by their "big-budget videos, lavish party-throwing, and dancefloor-ready music", DMX achieved success with a more dark, aggressive, "rugged", less "marketable" style. 

According to an Apple Music radio host: "It was a complete 180...Puff was controlling the clubs; you were watching Bad Boy Records pop bottles, wear Rolexes, Jesus pieces, Coogi sweaters. Then here comes this crazy energetic figure from Yonkers with the Timbs and the bandanas, running around with pitbulls, giving a perspective on the streets that a lot of people weren't familiar with and taking command of what hip-hop didn't look like." DMX's commercially successful violent lyricism helped popularize the horrorcore genre.

Discography

Studio albums
 It's Dark and Hell Is Hot (1998)
 Flesh of My Flesh, Blood of My Blood (1998)
 ... And Then There Was X (1999)
 The Great Depression (2001)
 Grand Champ (2003)
 Year of the Dog... Again (2006)
 Undisputed (2012)
Exodus (2021)

Awards and nominations
Grammy Award

American Music Award

MTV Video Music Award

Billboard Music Award

Filmography
Films

Video games

Television

See also
 Ruff Ryders
 Murder Inc.

Notes

References

External links

 

 
1970 births
2021 deaths
20th-century American rappers
21st-century American rappers
Accidental deaths in New York (state)
Actors from Arizona
Actors from Mount Vernon, New York
Actors from New York (state)
African-American Christians
African-American male actors
African-American male rappers
American clergy
American escapees
American male film actors
American people convicted of cruelty to animals
American people convicted of drug offenses
American people convicted of fraud
American people convicted of theft
American prisoners and detainees
Deacons
Cocaine-related deaths in New York (state)
Deaths from multiple organ failure
Def Jam Recordings artists
Gangsta rappers
East Coast hip hop musicians
Escapees from New York (state) detention
Former Jehovah's Witnesses
Horrorcore artists
Hardcore hip hop artists
Hypnotic Records artists
Male actors from New York (state)
Musicians from Mount Vernon, New York
Musicians from Phoenix, Arizona
Participants in American reality television series
People from Dobbs Ferry, New York
People from Teaneck, New Jersey
People from Yonkers, New York
People with bipolar disorder
Prisoners and detainees of Arizona
Prisoners and detainees of California
Prisoners and detainees of New York (state)
Prisoners and detainees of South Carolina
Prisoners and detainees of the United States federal government
Rappers from New York (state)
Ruff Ryders artists
21st-century African-American musicians
Murder Inc. (rap group) members